Aleksa Camur (born September 25, 1995) is a Bosnian-born American mixed martial artist who competes in the Light Heavyweight division of the Ultimate Fighting Championship.

Background
Born in Bosnia to a Serb family, his family moved to the U.S. when he was 2. After hearing off the success a local gym had in producing talented fighters like Stipe Miocic and Jessica Eye, at the age of 16, Camur decided to go to Strong Style MMA to take some classes. He went on to win three Golden Gloves titles in Ohio.

Mixed martial arts career

Early career
A professional since September 2017, Camir made his MMA debut at Iron Tiger Fight Series 76, defeating Randy Tran by knocking him out in the first round. He would go on to win his next 3 bouts on the regional scene, defeating David White at Iron Tiger Fight Series 78 via TKO in round two, then headlining Honor Fighting Championship 3, where Camur defeated Allen Bose via TKO in the first round. In his final bout on the regional scene, Camur defeated Marvin Skipper via TKO in round one at Honor FC 6.

In the main event of Dana White's Contender Series 22, Camur faced CES MMA veteran Fabio Cherant and went on to defeat him via TKO in the second round via flying knee to secure a UFC contract.

Ultimate Fighting Championship
Camur made his promotional debut against Justin Ledet on January 18, 2020 at UFC 246. He won the fight by unanimous decision.

In his sophomore performance, Camur faced William Knight at UFC 253 on September 27, 2020. For the first time in his professional career, he lost the bout via unanimous decision.

Camur faced Nicolae Negumereanu at UFC on ESPN: Jung vs. Ige on June 19, 2021. He lost the bout via split decision. Negumereanu illegally held Camur against the fence repeatedly which caused controversy. 

Camur was expected to face John Allan on November 6, 2021 at UFC 268.  However, Camur pulled out of the bout citing an undisclosed injury and was replaced by Dustin Jacoby.

Mixed martial arts record

|-
|Loss
|align=center| 6–2
|Nicolae Negumereanu
|Decision (split) 
|UFC on ESPN: The Korean Zombie vs. Ige
|
|align=center|3
|align=center|5:00
|Las Vegas, Nevada, United States
|
|-
| Loss
| align=center| 6–1
| William Knight
| Decision (unanimous)
| UFC 253
| 
| align=center| 3
| align=center| 5:00
| Abu Dhabi, United Arab Emirates
|
|-
| Win
| align=center| 6–0
| Justin Ledet
|Decision (unanimous)
|UFC 246 
|
|align=center|3
|align=center|5:00
|Las Vegas, Nevada, United States
|
|-
| Win
| align=center| 5–0
| Fabio Cherant
| TKO (flying knee and punches)
| Dana White's Contender Series 22
| 
|align=center|2
|align=center|0:48
| Las Vegas, Nevada, United States
|
|-
| Win
| align=center| 4–0
| Marvin Skipper
| TKO (punches)
|Honor FC 6
|
|align=center|1
|align=center|2:34
|Cleveland, Ohio, United States
| 
|-
| Win
| align=center| 3–0
| Allen Bose
| TKO (punches)
| Honor FC 3
| 
| align=center| 1
| align=center| 2:04
| Akron, Ohio, United States
| 
|-
| Win
| align=center| 2–0
| David White
| TKO (punches)
| IT Fight Series 78
| 
| align=center| 2
| align=center| 3:59
| North Olmsted, Ohio, United States
|
|-
| Win
| align=center| 1–0
| Randy Tran
| KO (punch)
| IT Fight Series 76
| 
| align=center| 1
| align=center| 0:20
| North Olmsted, Ohio, United States
|

See also 
 List of current UFC fighters
 List of male mixed martial artists

References

External links 
  
 

Living people
Light heavyweight mixed martial artists
1995 births
American male mixed martial artists
Mixed martial artists utilizing boxing
Ultimate Fighting Championship male fighters
American male boxers